Aeshi Khalfan Hilaly (born 12 December 1973) is a Tanzanian CCM politician and Member of Parliament for Sumbawanga Town constituency since 2010.

References

1973 births
Living people
Chama Cha Mapinduzi MPs
Tanzanian MPs 2010–2015